This is a list of Malayalam films released and films dubbed into Malayalam language  from the beginning, 1928-1960 in chronological order.

Released films 
The following is a list of Malayalam films released from the beginning, 1928-1960

1925-1950

1950-1959

Dubbed films 

The following is a list of films dubbed into Malayalam language from the beginning, 1928-1960

References

External links 

 Malayalam films before 1960 at IMDb

Malayalam
Malayalam
Malayalam
Malayalam
Malayalam
Malayalam
Malayalam
Malayalam

1930s
1960